The American Congo Company was a US-owned concessionary company that was active in the Congo Free State and its successor, the Belgian Congo.
At first it was focused on rubber extraction, but that soon shifted to diamond mining.

Formation

The American Congo Company was founded by Thomas Fortune Ryan and Daniel Guggenheim.
Other participants included Edwin B. Aldrich, J. P. Morgan and John D. Rockefeller Jr.
The company was incorporated in Albany, New York on 22 October 1906.
It was originally capitalized at $510,000, a sum that was soon increased to $25,000,000.
Also in 1906, King Leopold II arranged the creation of  the Sociètè Internationale Forestière et Minière du Congo (Forminière).
Americans took 25% to 50% of Forminière shares, with Leopold, the Congo Free State and Belgian investors holding the rest.
One of the purposes of the American Congo Company was to explore and exploit Forminière's mineral resources.

In November 1906 the American Congo Company was granted a 99-year licence to gather rubber and other vegetable products over a tract of land covering .
It was also given a 10-year option to buy  of land.
The company was to plant  of guayule (Parthenium argentatum) for every  of rubber extracted.
It planned to conduct experiments on different varieties of rubber plants.
The region was along the Congo River up to the confluence of the Kasai River.
Leopold was to receive half the profits of the company.

History

Soon after the American Congo Company was formed it was the subject of an exposé by the New York American which claimed that the owners had influenced Secretary of State Elihu Root to keep the United States government from meddling in the Congo Free State.
The result of the exposé was that the American government now had good reason to look into what Leopold II of Belgium was doing in the Congo Free State.
The treaty of 28 November 1908 ceding the Congo Free State to Belgium included a clause in which Belgium respected the concessions granted to the American Congo Company and Forminière, two companies in which the Congo Free State had large holdings.
The American Congo Company became a subsidiary of Forminière.
Through these two companies Americans owned up to half of the Belgian Congo's diamond operations.

In 1912 the American Congo Company established rubber processing factories in Kimpoko and Black River.
In practice, the rapid development of Malayan rubber plantations meant that the Congo development was unsuccessful, and the guayule process was never thoroughly tested.
By 1926 Forescom was operating the establishments of the American Congo Company in Bolobo and Kwamouth as a tenant.
In a convention of 6 February 1965 for settling the portfolio of the former Belgian Congo Colony, Article 15 transferred ownership of securities to the Democratic Republic of the Congo.
These included 2,500 preferred shares of $100 and 100 common shares of $100 of the American Congo Company.
177,750 shares of Forminière were also transferred.

Notes

Sources

Defunct forest products companies of the United States
1906 establishments in the Congo Free State
Belgian Congo